The Chicago Film Critics Association Awards for Best Foreign Language Film  is an annual award given by the Chicago Film Critics Association since 1988.  Until at least 1994, it was the award for Best Foreign Film, regardless of the language spoken in the film.

Winners

See also 
Academy Award for Best International Feature Film
Golden Globe Award for Best Foreign Language Film

References

External links 
Official webpage
List of latest winners

Chicago Film Critics Association Awards
Film awards for Best Foreign Language Film
Awards established in 1988